The women's time trial LC1–4/CP 3/4 road event in cycling at the 2004 Summer Paralympics was competed on 24 September. It was won by Karen Jacobsen, representing Denmark. Standings were decided by a calculated time.

Results

 24 Sept. 2004, 15:30

References

W
2004 in women's road cycling
Vouliagmeni Olympic Centre events